Adeeng, Ading is a town and a Gram panchayat in the Mathura district of the Indian state of Uttar Pradesh.

History
Ading in present is a historical village (presently a town) near Govardhan.
During the Jat rule, Mathura was divided into five parts - Ading, Sonsa, Saunkh, Farah and Govardhan. According to Hindu beliefs, Lord Krishna killed Aristasur at this place. Therefore, this area was known as Arishtagam (Arista). At present, it is known as Ading. This area was ruled by Tomar Khutela (Kuntal) Jats.  Arishta was named Ading due to the bigotry of these Jat rulers.  , Faudasingh, Jaitsingh, Balakchand were born  But Ading gained fame in history in the time of Anup Singh, Faud Singh, Jait Singh  In the time of Badan Singh, Raja Anoop Singh has been described as one of the powerful kings of Braj.

Geography

Historical place

Transport

References

Cities and towns in Mathura district